Pigritia sedis is a moth in the family Blastobasidae. It is found in Costa Rica.

The length of the forewings is about 4.6 mm. The forewings are pale brown intermixed with a few brownish-orange scales and brown scales. The hindwings are translucent pale brown, gradually darkening towards the apex.

Etymology
The specific name is derived from Latin sedes (meaning seat).

References

Moths described in 2013
Blastobasidae